Days and Clouds is a 2007 Italian drama film directed by Silvio Soldini. It was entered into the 30th Moscow International Film Festival where Margherita Buy won the award for Best Actress.

Plot
Set in Genoa, the film concerns the financial struggles and emotional strain that occur after Michele (Antonio Albanese) loses his job.  He and his wife Elsa (Margherita Buy) are forced to give up their affluent lifestyle and cope with the tensions of moving into a smaller home, finding new work, and making sacrifices.

Cast
 Margherita Buy as Elsa
 Antonio Albanese as Michele
 Giuseppe Battiston as Vito
 Alba Rohrwacher as Alice
 Carla Signoris as Nadia
 Fabio Troiano as Riki
 Paolo Sassanelli as Salviati
 Arnaldo Ninchi as Padre di Michele
 Teco Celio as Ragionier Terzetti
 Antonio Carlo Francini as Luciano
 Carlo Scola as Fabrizio
 Alberto Giusta as Roberto

References

External links
 
 

2007 films
2007 drama films
Italian drama films
2000s Italian-language films
Films directed by Silvio Soldini
2000s Italian films